Henricus ellampus is a species of moth of the family Tortricidae. It is found in Costa Rica.

The wingspan is about 19 mm. The ground colour of the forewings is whitish cream, strigulated (finely streaked) with cream and suffused with pale brownish cream at the base and subdorsally. The hindwings are pale cream grey.

References

Moths described in 1992
Henricus (moth)